The men's sabre was one of seven fencing events on the fencing at the 1952 Summer Olympics programme. It was the twelfth appearance of the event. The competition was held from 31 July 1952 to 1 August 1952. 66 fencers from 26 nations competed. Nations were limited to three fencers each. The event was won by Pál Kovács, the sixth of nine straight Games in which a Hungarian would win the event. Kovács became the fourth man to win multiple medals in the individual sabre, adding to his 1948 bronze. Hungary swept the medals in the event for the second time (the first was in 1912). Aladár Gerevich's silver completed a set of three different color medals in the event, the first man to win three medals in individual sabre. Tibor Berczelly earned bronze.

Background

This was the 12th appearance of the event, which is the only fencing event to have been held at every Summer Olympics. Seven of the eight finalists from 1948 returned (all except American Tibor Nyilas: gold medalist (and 1936 bronze medalist) Aladár Gerevich of Hungary, silver medalist (and 1936 finalist) Vincenzo Pinton of Italy, bronze medalist Pál Kovács of Hungary, fourth-place finisher Jacques Lefèvre of France, fifth-place finisher George Worth of the United States, sixth-place finisher Gastone Darè of Italy, and eighth-place finisher Antonio Haro of Mexico. Gerevich was the reigning (1951) world champion, with Darè (1949) and Jean Levavasseur of France (1950) other recent world champions competing. Kovács was also a world champion, though not so recently—he had won in 1937.

Australia, Guatemala, Japan, Saar, the Soviet Union, Portugal, and Venezuela each made their debut in the men's sabre. Italy and Denmark each made their 10th appearance in the event, tied for most of any nation, each having missed two of the first three events but having appeared every Games since 1908.

Competition format

The competition format was pool play round-robin, with bouts to five touches. Not all bouts were played in some pools if not necessary to determine advancement. Ties were broken through fence-off bouts ("barrages") in early rounds if necessary for determining advancement. Ties not necessary for advancement were either not broken (if at least one fencer had not finished all bouts in the round-robin) or broken first by touches received and then by touches scored. In the final, ties were broken by barrage if necessary for medal placement but otherwise first by touches received and then by touches scored. The fencers from the top four teams in the team sabre event received a bye in the first round.

 Round 1: There 7 pools of between 7 and 8 fencers each. The top 4 fencers in each pool advanced to the quarterfinals.
 Quarterfinals: There were 5 pools of 8 fencers each. The top 4 fencers in each quarterfinal advanced to the semifinals.
 Semifinals: There were 3 pools of 6 or 7 fencers each. The top 3 fencers in each semifinal advanced to the final.
 Final: The final pool had 9 fencers.

Schedule

All times are Eastern European Summer Time (UTC+3)

Results

Round 1

The top 4 finishers in each pool advanced to the quarterfinals. Fencers from the four teams that advanced to the final of the men's team foil event received byes through round 1:
 France: Jacques Lefèvre, Jean Levavasseur, and Jean-François Tournon
 Italy: Gastone Darè, Renzo Nostini, and Vincenzo Pinton
 Hungary: Tibor Berczelly, Aladár Gerevich, and Pál Kovács
 United States: Joe de Capriles, Allan Kwartler, and George Worth

Pool 1

Pool 2

Plattner defeated Molnar in a barrage for fourth place.

Pool 3

Pool 4

Carnera defeated Rau in a barrage for fourth place.

Pool 5

Pool 6

Amez-Droz defeated Liebscher in a barrage for fourth place.

Pool 7

Abdel Rahman defeated Eriksson in a barrage for fourth place.

Quarterfinals

The top 4 finishers in each pool advanced to the semifinals.

Quarterfinal 1

Quarterfinal 2

Quarterfinal 3

Quarterfinal 4

Quarterfinal 5

Semifinals

The top 3 finishers in each pool advanced to the final. Renzo Nostini did not compete in the semifinals.

Semifinal 1

Semifinal 2

Ballister defeated Loisel in a barrage for third place.

Semifinal 3

Final

Berczelly defeated Darè in a barrage for the bronze medal.

References

Sabre men
Men's events at the 1952 Summer Olympics